Dance Concerts, California 1958 is the second volume of The Private Collection a series documenting recordings made by American pianist, composer and bandleader Duke Ellington for his personal collection which was first publicly released on the LMR label in 1987 and later on the Saja label.

Reception
The Allmusic reviewer Scott Yanow stated: "The music on this CD sticks to standards (some of which were not usually associated with Duke) and can be thought of as a live version of Indigos... A typically excellent example of 1958 Duke Ellington".

Track listing
:All compositions by Duke Ellington except as indicated
 "Main Stem" - 3:26  
 "Dancing in the Dark" (Howard Dietz, Arthur Schwartz) - 4:22  
 "Stompy Jones" - 3:36  
 "Time on My Hands" (Harold Adamson, Mack Gordon, Vincent Youmans) - 4:36  
 "Stompin' at the Savoy" (Benny Goodman, Chick Webb, Edgar Sampson, Andy Razaf) - 5:29  
 "Sophisticated Lady" (Ellington, Irving Mills, Mitchell Parish) - 3:44  
 "Take the 'A' Train" (Billy Strayhorn) - 4:27  
 "All Heart" (Ellington, Strayhorn) - 3:46  
 "Just A-Sittin' and A-Rockin'" (Ellington, Gaines, Strayhorn  4:15  
 "Take the 'A' Train" (Strayhorn) - 3:53  
 "Where or When" (Lorenz Hart, Richard Rodgers) - 4:28  
 "The Mooche" (Ellington, Mills) - 5:42  
 "One O'Clock Jump" (Count Basie) - 6:10  
 "Autumn Leaves" (Joseph Kosma, Jacques Prévert, Johnny Mercer) - 6:47  
 "Oh, Lady Be Good" (George Gershwin, Ira Gershwin) - 5:56  
 "Things Ain't What They Used to Be" (Mercer Ellington) - 1:37 
Recorded at Travis Air Force Base, Fairfield, California on March 4, 1958.

Personnel
Duke Ellington – piano
Shorty Baker, Clark Terry - trumpet
Ray Nance - trumpet, violin, vocals (tracks 9 & 10)
Quentin Jackson, Britt Woodman - trombone
John Sanders - valve trombone
Jimmy Hamilton - clarinet, tenor saxophone
Bill Graham - alto saxophone 
Russell Procope - alto saxophone, clarinet 
Paul Gonsalves - tenor saxophone 
Harry Carney - baritone saxophone, clarinet, bass clarinet
Jimmy Woode - bass 
Sam Woodyard - drums
Ossie Bailey - vocals (track 14)

References

1987 live albums
Duke Ellington live albums
Saja Records live albums